Orăștioara de Sus is a commune in Hunedoara County, Transylvania, Romania. It is composed of eight villages: Bucium (Bucsum), Costești (Kosztesd), Costești-Deal, Grădiștea de Munte (Gredistye), Ludeștii de Jos (Ludesd), Ludeștii de Sus (Felsőludesd), Ocolișu Mic (Kisoklos) and Orăștioara de Sus.

Two of the Dacian Fortresses of the Orăștie Mountains, Costești-Cetățuie and Costești-Blidaru, are located near Costești village. A third, Sarmizegetusa Regia, is located near Grădiștea de Munte.
A Roman fort is located near Bucium village.

Gallery

References

Communes in Hunedoara County
Localities in Transylvania